The karna or karnay (Arabic,  karnā, qarnā, Hindi karnā, Tajik карнай karnai, also karnaj, Uzbek karnay, Kazakh керней kernei) is a metal natural trumpet.  The name is first mentioned in the biblical book of Daniel, used in the Middle Ages to the Persian military bands and in the Indian Mughal Empire to the representative orchestra naqqāra-khāna and which is still used by this name in ceremonial music in Central Asia and northern India.

Since the middle of the 3rd millennium B.C., trumpets known in both Mesopotamia and Ancient Egypt were used in both regions as signaling instruments in ceremonies, warfare and work assignments. They could only produce one or two notes, but could send messages using patterns of rhythm. Karnā derives from Aramaic qarnāʾ, Hebrew qeren and Akkadian qarnu. In addition to the Arabic word būq for brass instruments in general (horns and trumpets), in medieval Arabic texts nafīr predominantly referred to a slender, cylindrical, shrill-sounding metal trumpet, būq a slightly shorter, conical trumpet and karnā a conical, sometimes S-shaped trumpet up to two meters long. The trumpet types nafīr and karnā were used in Iran, together with various drums and other percussion instruments, in the naqqāra-khāna until the early 20th century. Today the karnā in Uzbekistan and Tajikistan is a long, mostly cylindrical metal trumpet, and in northern India it is a straight, tapered metal trumpet that can be long and thin or short and wide.

It is used in the music of Iran, Tajikistan, and Uzbekistan, where it is considered a national instrument.

KARNAY
The kernei is a Kyrgyz wind musical instrument, which as well as the surnai was not modernised for ensembles or orchestras and exists in traditional form. It is used particularly for signaling or as a ceremonial instrument with a powerful sound and piercing timbre. There are two kinds of kernei: the muiuz kernei (made from a mountain goat horn), and the jez kernei (made of copper or brass). Both of them are very different instruments, but they are combined by lack of playing apertures.

Muiuz kernei

The muiuz kernei is an ancient instrument made from a curved mountain goat horn, ranging in length between 30 and 40 cm. The instrument does not have a mouthpiece and gives only a few sounds of thick, soft timbre. The Military Brass Band of the Commandant Regiment of the Ministry of Defense of Tajikistan (the only military band in the world to use karnays) uses the Muiuz kernei.

Jez kernei
The jez kernei is 1–2 m long longitudinal trumpet with/without a mouthpiece. Faucet diameter is 20 cm. The similarity between the jez kernei and the Uzbek and Uighur karnai is accounted by the territorial nearness of South Kyrgyzstan and Uzbekistan. The sound of Kernei is very strong, loud and intended for outdoor areas. Some time in the past the kernei'''s applied function was restricted by notification of important events, but today it is typically used for national holidays.

The separate group of Kyrgyz aerophones represent the instruments, which considerably yield the main kinds of folk wind instruments by quality of timbre and artistic importance. They can be called as noise instruments. They were not produced by people, they exist in the nature and produce neither musical nor artistic sounds. They include the chymyldak - produce squeak, yshkyryk - whistle, baryldak - under tongue aerophone, chynyrtky - hunter's quail call, jalbyrak'' - "explosive" aerophone.

References

Persian script:
hashkamelash kamelash lokimash habash

Kazakhstani musical instruments
Kyrgyz musical instruments
Tajik musical instruments
Turkmenistan music
Uzbekistani musical instruments
Articles containing video clips
Iranian inventions